Raivo Puusepp (born 21 March 1960) is an Estonian architect.

His notable works include:
Main building of SEB in Tallinn
Tartu Department Store, Tartu
Solaris Center, Tallinn
WW Passage (WW Passaaž), Tallinn
Sikupilli Shopping Centre, Tallinn

Gallery

References

External links 
Official website

1960 births
Living people
Estonian architects
Estonian Academy of Arts alumni